Mitchell Brett Achurch (born 14 July 1988) is an Australian rugby league footballer who most recently played for the Leeds Rhinos (Heritage No.) in the Super League, and Featherstone Rovers (Heritage No. 1034) (loan) in the Championship.

Playing career
After previously playing lower grade rugby for Western Suburbs in the NSW Cup, Achurch made his NRL début in round 4 of the 2012 NRL season against the Parramatta Eels, playing for the Penrith Panthers, who went on to win the game 39-6

During August 2012, Achurch signed for Leeds on a four-year contract starting in the 2013 season.

He played in the 2015 Challenge Cup Final victory over Hull Kingston Rovers at Wembley Stadium.

He was left out of the 2015 Super League Grand Final victory over the Wigan Warriors at Old Trafford.

Achurch currently plays for Ron Massey Cup side the Guildford Owls.

On 28 August 2017, Achurch was named in the 2017 Ron Massey Cup team of the season.

References

External links
Statistics at therhinos.co.uk
Statistics at penrithpanthers.com.au

1988 births
Living people
Australian people of English descent
Australian expatriate sportspeople in England
Australian rugby league players
Featherstone Rovers players
Leeds Rhinos players
Mackay Cutters players
Penrith Panthers players
Rugby league players from Sydney
Rugby league props
Rugby league second-rows
Western Suburbs Magpies NSW Cup players
Windsor Wolves players